Rosslee is a surname. Notable people with the surname include:

Craig Rosslee (born 1970), South African footballer and manager
Matthew Rosslee (born 1987), South African rugby union player